Roc Nation Sports is the sports management division of Roc Nation.

History

Roc Nation Sports was founded by Shawn "JAY-Z" Carter in Spring 2013 in partnership with Creative Artists Agency, a prominent talent agency based in Los Angeles. Roc Nation Sports' first major move was signing New York Yankees All-Star second baseman Robinson Canó. They have also signed New York Giants receiver Victor Cruz and WNBA prospect Skylar Diggins-Smith to Roc Nation Sports. On June 20, 2013 it was revealed that Jay-Z was officially certified as a sports agent for the National Basketball Association and Major League Baseball. On May 1, 2014 Roc Nation Sports added James Young of the Kentucky Wildcats. In November 2014, Dallas Cowboys wide receiver Dez Bryant would also join the company. On January 3, 2018, it was announced that Penn State running back Saquon Barkley had signed with Roc Nation Sports prior to entering the 2018 NFL Draft. Roc Nation Sports currently boasts a roster with over 100 athletes across Baseball, Basketball, American Football, International Football, Rugby, and E-Sports.  They also have a burgeoning broadcaster division.

Clients
Baseball

 Stephen Alemais, Pittsburgh Pirates
 Erick Aybar, Acereros de Monclova
 Patrick Bailey, San Francisco Giants
 Robinson Canó, New York Mets
 Rusney Castillo, Boston Red Sox
 Yoenis Céspedes, Free Agent
 Jazz Chisholm Jr., Miami Marlins
 DeMarcus Evans, Texas Rangers
 Jeremy Jeffress, Milwaukee Brewers
 Jason Martin, Pittsburgh Pirates
 Max Meyer, Miami Marlins
 Shelby Miller, Chicago Cubs
 Jacob Nottingham, Milwaukee Brewers
 D. J. Peterson, Chicago White Sox
 Dustin Peterson, Detroit Tigers
 Eddie Rosario, Minnesota Twins
 CC Sabathia, New York Yankees
 Mike Shawaryn, Boston Red Sox
 Braden Shipley, Arizona Diamondbacks
 Dominic Smith, New York Mets
 Marcus Wilson, Boston Red Sox
 Masyn Winn, St. Louis Cardinals

Basketball 

 Precious Achiuwa, Toronto Raptors
 Al-Farouq Aminu, Free Agent
 D.J. Augustin, Free Agent
 LaMelo Ball, Charlotte Hornets
 LiAngelo Ball, Greensboro Swarm
 Chris Boucher, Toronto Raptors 
 Trey Burke, Stockton Kings
 Zylan Cheatham, Birmingham Squadron
 Skylar Diggins-Smith, Phoenix Mercury
 Tyson Etienne, College Park Skyhawks
 Markelle Fultz, Orlando Magic
 Rudy Gay, Utah Jazz
 Danny Green, Houston Rockets
 Quade Green, Free Agent
 Ron Harper Jr., Toronto Raptors
 Danuel House, Philadelphia 76ers
 Kyrie Irving, Dallas Mavericks
 Caris LeVert, Cleveland Cavaliers
 Patrick McCaw, Delaware Blue Coats
 Jabari Parker, Free Agent
 Kevin Porter Jr., Houston Rockets
 Immanuel Quickley, New York Knicks
 Jahmi'us Ramsey, Oklahoma City Blue
 Quinton Rose, Westchester Knicks
 Isaiah Stewart, Detroit Pistons
 P. J. Washington, Charlotte Hornets
 Justise Winslow, Portland Trail Blazers
 James Young, Kolossos Rodou

American Football

 Jaire Alexander, Green Bay Packers
 Saquon Barkley, New York Giants
 Dez Bryant, Free Agent
 Gabe Davis, Buffalo Bills
 Leonard Fournette, Tampa Bay Buccaneers
 Todd Gurley, Atlanta Falcons
 C.J. Henderson, Jacksonville Jaguars
 Nick Kwiatkoski, Las Vegas Raiders
 Bryce Love, Washington Commanders 
 Julian Okwara, Detroit Lions
 Romeo Okwara, Detroit Lions
 JuJu Smith-Schuster, Kansas City Chiefs
 Ronnie Stanley, Baltimore Ravens
 Ndamukong Suh, Tampa Bay Buccaneers
 Andrew Thomas, New York Giants

Football / Soccer
 Axel Witsel, Atlético Madrid
 Eric Bailly, Manchester United 
 Romelu Lukaku, Inter Milan (On a loan from Chelsea)
Federico Dimarco, Inter Milan
 Samuel Chukwueze, Villarreal CF
 Reece James, Chelsea
 Lauren James, Chelsea
 Nigel James, Elite Coaching Academy Director
 Dakota Watterson, Free Agent
 Tyrone Mings, Aston Villa
 Marcus Rashford, Manchester United
 A.C. Milan
 Jordan Lukaku, Lazio Tyreece John-Jules, Blackpool (on loan from Arsenal) Nathan Ferguson, Crystal Palace
 Vontae Daley-Campbell, Leicester City
 Matteo Ritaccio, Liverpool
 Luca Ashby-Hammond, Fulham
 Xavier Amaechi, Hamburger SV
 Brooke Norton-Cuffy, Arsenal
 Taye Ashby-Hammond, Maidenhead United (on loan from Fulham)''
 Leeds United F.C
Mamelodi Sundowns 

Rugby
Cheslin Kolbe
Siya Kolisi
Maro Itoje
Tendai Mtawarira
Sbu Nkosi
 Aphelele Fassi 

Netball
Bongi Msomi 

Cricket
Lungi Ngidi
Temba Bavuma

Personalities 
 Tony Allen
 Caron Butler
 Victor Cruz
 Zach Randolph
 Jalen Rose
 Kenny Smith
 Michael Vick

Esports
Musa'ad Al-Dossary

References

External links 
 RocNation.com

Jay-Z
2013 establishments in New York (state)
Companies based in New York City
American companies established in 2013
Roc Nation
Sports management companies